Michael Inwood (12 February 1944 – 31 December 2021) was a British philosopher and fellow of Trinity College, Oxford. He is known for his works on Hegel, Heidegger and ancient philosophy. Inwood died from lung cancer in Kidlington on 31 December 2021, at the age of 77.

Publications

See also 
 Christiane Sourvinou-Inwood

References

External links
Memorial page
Michael Inwood obituary. Distinguished yet unassuming Oxford philosopher who ignored convention
The Man Who Put Me in Awe of the Philosopher's Vocation
In memoriam: Michael Inwood
Library thing

1944 births
2021 deaths
20th-century British philosophers
21st-century British philosophers
Fellows of Trinity College, Oxford
Hegel scholars
Heidegger scholars
Philosophy academics
Academics from London